Marin Local Music (MLM) is a social network for audiences of live, local music in Marin County, California. MLM uses technology to organize, inform and promote its members, activities and local bands as well as publicizing local merchants and produces events in Marin County, California. It has been involved in "Stop the Spray", "Home Away from Homelessness", and "Search for the Cause Gala".

History
MLM was created by Shelley and Dave Champine, in June 2008.

Shelley has been producing, managing, and promoting live entertainment for more than 20 years. Her degree in theatre with emphasis in stage management and direction formed the foundation of her career. Upon moving to San Francisco, she joined Beach Blanket Babylon and worked in numerous production roles for 10 years. For several years with two kids, she took side projects in corporate event planning and theatrical production. With kids came a move to the suburbs, but she remained enthusiastic about going outside and dance. After continuous frustration scouring newspapers and trying to convince her friends that there was nightlife in Marin, she decided to apply her considerable organizational skills to this problem. With the encouragement of numerous musicians and venues, Shelley started La Vida Local Events to promote live events.

While Dave also has a degree in Theatre, his career is in technology. He has been designing, building, maintaining and marketing networks and software for nearly 20 years. His experience includes building the e-mail network for Charles Schwab and directing software product development for systems used by millions of users worldwide. Dave also founded his own company and has been general manager for multiple software product lines.

Technology
The website itself is built using Drupal, an open-source content management system. This provides a way to present information and allows other members of the music community to contribute their content.

External links
 Norcal.FM is a website dedicate to the local music scene in northern California. Norcal. FM is an Internet Radio Station.
 Marin IJ Article Article in the Marin Independent Journal about Shelley Champine and Marin Local Music
 Marin IJ Article Article in the Marin Independent Journal about local Battle of the Bands event co-produced by Marin Local Music
 Pacific Sun Article Article in the Pacific Sun mentions Marin Local Music
 Pacific Sun Article Article in the Pacific Sun about local Battle for the Stage event produced by Marin Local Music

Companies based in San Rafael, California
Mass media in Marin County, California